USS Armadillo (IX-111), the lead ship of her class of tanker was the only ship of the United States Navy to be named for the armadillo, an insect-eating mammal which has an armorlike shell encasing its back and head.

Construction
She was laid down 24 September 1943, under a Maritime Commission (MARCOM) contract, MC hull No. 1900, as the Type T1 tanker Sidney Howard, by California Shipbuilding Corporation, Terminal Island, Los Angeles, California; launched on 26 October 1943; sponsored by Mrs. S. Howard; renamed Armadillo and designated IX-111; acquired by the Navy on a bareboat basis, and simultaneously placed in commission at San Pedro, Los Angeles, on 18 November 1943.

Service history
Following her commissioning, the vessel began a period of final fitting out and shakedown training off the southern California coast. In January 1944, Armadillo was assigned to Service Force, US Pacific Fleet, and sailed for Pearl Harbor. From early February through early April 1944, the vessel carried personnel and petroleum products between Pearl Harbor and Tarawa, Gilbert Islands. On 22 April, she reported to Majuro Atoll, Marshall Islands, where she served as a station tanker through late August. Armadillo then shifted to Ulithi, Caroline Islands, to perform the same duty. This service was broken by trips to Guam and Saipan in the Mariana Islands and to Peleliu in the Palau Islands.

Armadillo left Ulithi on 10 April 1945, and shaped a course for Okinawa. She arrived there on 18 April, and began providing services to various ships of the Pacific Fleet. On 1 February 1946, the tanker departed Buckner Bay, Okinawa, and headed for the East Coast of the United States. She transited the Panama Canal on 13 March, and continued on to Norfolk, Virginia. The vessel reached that port on 23 March, and began preparations for her inactivation. Armadillo was decommissioned on 29 May 1946, and, on the same day, was delivered to MARCOM's War Shipping Administration (WSA) at Lee Hall, Virginia, and laid up in the National Defense Reserve Fleet's James River Group. Her name was struck from the Naval Vessel Register on 19 June 1946.

Merchant service
Acquired by Hasler & Co., agents, for the Windsor Navigation Co., on 3 February 1948, the ship was delivered to her purchaser at Baltimore, Maryland, on 14 April 1948. Renamed Dean H. She was later sold to Liberian interests in November 1954, but returned to the US flag on 3 March 1959. Sold to Winco Tankers, Inc., on the same day, she was renamed Chris H., and carried that name until the title returned to the Maritime Administration (MARAD) the day after Christmas of 1962. Then operated by Winco Tankers, Inc., under a bareboat charter, Chris H. was deactivated on 7 February 1963, and returned to the James River Reserve Fleet where she remained until purchased by N. V. Intershitra on 22 February 1972. She was delivered to her purchaser on 10 March 1972, to be broken up for scrap in the Netherlands.

Awards
Armadillo earned one battle star for her World War II service.

Notes 

Citations

Bibliography 

Online resources

External links
 

Liberty ships
Ships built in Los Angeles
Armadillo-class tankers
1943 ships
James River Reserve Fleet